In computer science, an (a,b) tree is a kind of balanced search tree.

The root has, if it is not a leaf, between 2 and  children.

Definition 
Let ,  be positive integers such that . Then a rooted tree  is an (a,b)-tree when:
 Every inner node except the root has at least  and at most  children.
 The root has at most  children.
 All paths from the root to the leaves are of the same length.

Internal node representation 
Every internal node  of a (a,b)-tree  has the following representation:
 Let  be the number of child nodes of node .
 Let  be pointers to child nodes.

See also
B-tree
2-3 tree
2-4 tree

References
 

Search trees